The members of the 11th Manitoba Legislature were elected in the Manitoba general election held in July 1903. The legislature sat from January 7, 1904, to February 28, 1907.

The Conservatives led by Rodmond Roblin formed the government.

Thomas Greenway of the Liberal Party served as Leader of the Opposition. After Greenway entered federal politics in November 1904, Charles Mickle became opposition leader.

James Johnson served as speaker for the assembly.

There were four sessions of the 11th Legislature:

Daniel Hunter McMillan was Lieutenant Governor of Manitoba.

Members of the Assembly 
The following members were elected to the assembly in 1903:

Notes:

By-elections 
By-elections were held to replace members for various reasons:

Notes:

References 

Terms of the Manitoba Legislature
1904 establishments in Manitoba
1907 disestablishments in Manitoba